Statistics of the Scottish Football League in season 1987–88.

Scottish Premier Division

Scottish First Division

Scottish Second Division

 
Scottish Football League seasons